Graham Cooke is NIHR Professor of Infectious Diseases at the Wright-Fleming Institute of Imperial College London. He is a specialist in the treatment of hepatitis C. He is chairman of the World Health Organization's Essential Medicines List.

References

British infectious disease physicians
Year of birth missing (living people)
Living people
Academics of Imperial College London
NIHR Research Professors
Hepatitis C virus
Hepatitis researchers